Little League Volunteer Stadium is a baseball stadium in South Williamsport, Pennsylvania.  Along with Howard J. Lamade Stadium, it annually hosts the Little League World Series, one of the few sports events where children 12 years old and younger take the center stage.

Volunteer Stadium was built starting in 2000 to accommodate the growth of the Little League World Series, and was completed in 2001. Its seating capacity is 3,000. The stadium is comparable in seating capacity to Lamade Stadium but with far less standing room; the berms surrounding the stadium are much smaller, limiting potential attendance to 5,000 spectators, as opposed to the over 40,000 that can be accommodated at Lamade Stadium. Volunteer Stadium is used for double-elimination pool play only. All elimination games and consolation games are played at Lamade Stadium.

Baseball venues in Pennsylvania
Volunteer Stadium
Buildings and structures in Lycoming County, Pennsylvania
Tourist attractions in Lycoming County, Pennsylvania
2001 establishments in Pennsylvania
Sports venues completed in 2001